Villanueva de Carazo is a municipality located in the province of Burgos, Castile and León, Spain. According to the 2004 census (INE), the municipality has a population of 30 inhabitants.

There are a few signs attesting to this, and the site is popular among tourists.

References

Municipalities in the Province of Burgos